Shalom Y'all is a restaurant serving Israeli, Mediterranean, and Middle Eastern cuisine in Portland, Oregon.

Description
Shalom Y'all is a restaurant in southeast Portland's Buckman neighborhood. Portland Monthly has described the restaurant as an "Israeli street food kitchen". The menu has included cucumber-kohlrabi salads, hummus plates with maitake mushrooms or braised lamb, oregano-perfumed lambchops, muhamara, a blackberry Manischewitz-spiked spritzer, and flatbread with a roasted pepper spread and pomegranate molasses.

History

The original restaurant was established in May 2016, initially operating in the Pine Street Market. The business relocated to 1128 Southwest Alder Street in 2017. Plans for a second location in southeast Portland were announced in November 2017. The business is operated by Sesame Collective. Laura Amans, Jamal Hassan, Kasey Mills are co-owners.

The restaurant's phone system was hacked in 2019. In January 2021, both locations were vandalized with anti-Israel graffiti. Michael Russell of The Oregonian wrote in 2021: 

In mid 2021, the business's Southwest Alder Street location closed and rebranded as Lil' Shalom. The Shalom Y'all on Southeast Taylor Street continued to operate as usual.

See also
 List of Middle Eastern restaurants

References

External links

 
 

2016 establishments in Oregon
Asian restaurants in Portland, Oregon
Buckman, Portland, Oregon
European restaurants in Portland, Oregon
Israeli American
Israeli restaurants
Mediterranean restaurants in Oregon
Middle Eastern restaurants in the United States
Middle Eastern-American culture in Portland, Oregon
Restaurants established in 2016